Michael Stupple is a Rugby Union player. He can play at either Number 8 or Centre. He made his debut for Exeter in 2009 against Doncaster.

Stupple was one of several players released from Exeter Chiefs for the 2012–13 season.

References

External links

1990 births
Living people
Exeter Chiefs players
Plymouth Albion R.F.C. players
Rugby union players from Epsom